Smooth Radio may refer to:

 Smooth Radio (2010), the original national network in the UK
 Smooth Radio (2014)

See also
 Smoothfm, Australian radio stations named Smooth